Jordan Creek (Pennsylvania Dutch: Hollenbach) is a  tributary of Little Lehigh Creek in Lehigh County, Pennsylvania.

Jordan Creek arises from a natural spring on Blue Mountain. The spring is located downhill from the Bake Oven Knob shelter on the Appalachian Trail in Heidelberg Township in Lehigh County. The water course then flows intermittently downhill past Mountain Road, carrying further south through Heidelberg Township and passing through the Trexler Nature Preserve in Schnecksville.

Jordan Creek joins Little Lehigh Creek in Allentown before soon flowing into the Lehigh River.

Jordan Creek is one several Lehigh Valley locations, along with Bethlehem, Egypt, and Emmaus, whose name was inspired by locations referenced in the Bible.

Tributaries
Elk Ridge Run
Haasadahl Creek
Hegel's Run
Macintosh Run
Mill Creek 
Schantz Valley Creek
Switzer Creek
Thicket Run

See also
List of rivers of Pennsylvania
Trexler Nature Preserve

References

External links

U.S. Geological Survey: PA stream gaging stations

Geography of Allentown, Pennsylvania
Tributaries of the Lehigh River
Rivers of Pennsylvania
Rivers of Lehigh County, Pennsylvania